Farr is a surname, and may refer to:

 Bruce Farr (born 1949), New Zealand yacht designer
 Charles Farr (builder) (c. 1812–1888), timber merchant and builder in South Australia
 Charles Farr (civil servant) (1959–2019), British civil servant, intelligence officer, and diplomat
 Diane Farr (born 1969), American actress
 Felicia Farr (born 1932), American actress
 Finis Farr (b. 1904), American author
 Florence Farr (1860–1917), British stage actress and composer
 Gareth Farr (born 1968), New Zealand composer
 Gary Farr (1944–1994), English singer
 George Henry Farr (1819–1904), Anglican priest and headmaster in South Australia
 George W. Farr (1875–1957), Justice of the Montana Supreme Court
 Glenn Farr, film and TV editor
 Grahame Farr (1912–1983), maritime historian
 Heather Farr (1965–1993), American golfer
 Hilary Farr (born 1951), Canadian reality television personality
 Jack Farr (born 1946), US military intelligence officer
 James M. Farr (1874–1947), English language scholar and president of the University of Florida (1927–1928)
 Jamie Farr (born 1934), Lebanese-American actor 
 Jim Farr (born 1956), former American baseball player
 John Farr (disambiguation), several people including:
 John R. Farr (1857–1933), American politician
 John Farr (British politician) (1922–1997), Conservative Party politician
 John Farr, nom-de-plume of novelist Jack Webb
 Judi Farr (born 1936), Australian actress
 Julia Farr (1824–1914), philanthropist in South Australia, wife of George Henry Farr
 Lorin Farr (1820–1909), Mormon pioneer
 Malcolm Farr (born 1951), Australian journalist
 Malcolm D. Farr (1884-1956), American businessman and politician
 A family of American football players:
 First generation (brothers):
 Miller Farr (b. 1943), cornerback
 Mel Farr (1944–2015), running back; also notable as a businessman
 Second generation (both sons of Mel):
 Mel Farr Jr. (b. 1966), running back
 Mike Farr (b. 1967), cornerback
 Nick Farr-Jones (b. 1962), former Australian rugby union player
 Patricia Farr (1913–1948), American movie actress
 Sam Farr (b. 1941), American politician
 Stephen Farr, British organist
 Steve Farr (b. 1956), former American baseball player
 Tommy Farr (1913–1986), Welsh boxer
 Tyler Farr (b. 1984), American country music singer
 Walter Percy Farr (1889–1940), Australian Army officer
 Walter 'Snowy' Farr (1919–2007), English charity fundraiser
 Wanda Kirkbride Farr (1895–1983), American botanist
 William Farr (1807–1883), British epidemiologist
 William C. Farr (1841–1921)

See also
 Pfarr